Task Force 88 (TF88) was the escort carrier force, commanded by Rear Admiral Thomas Hope Troubridge of the Royal Navy, that supported Operation Dragoon, the Allied invasion of southern France. It was activated in August 1944, and dispersed on 29 August when the carrier force departed to operate in the Aegean.

TF88 was a mixed task force of Royal Navy and United States Navy ships that was stationed off Provence. Its tasks were to achieve air superiority over the landing beaches, provide air support for the ground forces by suppressing enemy resistance and movement, destroying military infrastructure and artillery spotting for the naval bombardment.

The TF 88 designation was later used for Operation Argus, an ocean-based US nuclear test series in the late 1950s.

Task Force 88 order of battle

Task Force 88 was made up of two naval groups, 88.1 and 88.2 with VOC-01, a observation composite squadron with 12 Grumman F6F Hellcat nightfighters operating out of Corsica.

Notes

References

United States Navy task forces
Operation Dragoon